Max Schede (7 January 1844 – 31 December 1902) was a German surgeon born in Arnsberg.

Schede studied medicine at the Universities of Halle, Heidelberg and Zurich, obtaining his medical doctorate in 1866. After serving as a doctor in the Austro-Prussian War, he became an assistant to Richard von Volkmann (1830-1889) at Halle. During the Franco-Prussian War, he was in charge of a Feldlazaretts. In 1875, he appointed head of the surgical department at Friedrichshain Hospital in Berlin, and from onward 1880, he practiced surgery at St. Georg Hospital in Hamburg.

At Hamburg he was a catalyst towards the construction of Eppendorf Hospital, becoming head of its surgical department in 1888. In 1895 he was chosen professor of surgery at the University of Bonn. Schede was a pioneer of antisepsis in Germany.

In 1890 he introduced a surgical procedure called thoracoplasty, an operation involving resection of the thorax for treatment of chronic empyema. His name is associated with the "Schede method", also known as "Schede's clot", a procedure that involves scraping off dead tissue in bone necrosis, allowing the cavity to fill with blood, then covering it with gauze and rubber.

In 1874 he was a co-founder of the journal "Zentralblatt für Chirurgie".

Selected writings 
 Meine Erfahrungen über Nierenexstirpationen, 1899 – On extirpation of the kidneys. 
 Die angeborene Luxation des Hüftgelenkes, 1900 – Congenital dislocation of the hip.

References 
 "This article is based on a translation of an equivalent article at the German Wikipedia".
 

German surgeons
Academic staff of the University of Bonn
1844 births
1902 deaths
People from Arnsberg
University of Halle alumni
Heidelberg University alumni
University of Zurich alumni
Academic staff of the University of Hamburg